Lindmania smithiana is a plant species in the genus Lindmania. This species is endemic to Venezuela.

References
Checklist of Venezuelan Bromeliaceae with Notes on Species Distribution by State and Levels of Endemism retrieved 3 November 2009

smithiana
Flora of Venezuela